BYO Split Series Volume IV is a split album released in 2002 as the fourth entry in BYO Records BYO Split Series. The album features twelve tracks by American punk rock bands the Bouncing Souls and Anti-Flag. Each band covers one song originally by the other, with The Bouncing Souls performing "That's Youth" and Anti-Flag performing "The Freaks, Nerds & Romantics". Other covers are Cock Sparrer's "We're Coming Back" and Sticks and Stones' "Less Than Free" by The Bouncing Souls and the Buzzcocks' "Ever Fallen In Love" by Anti-Flag. The remaining tracks were originally recorded for this album.

For the release of this album, The Bouncing Souls and Anti-Flag toured nationally together.

Track listing

Personnel
Tracks 1-6:
Greg Attonito – vocals
Pete Steinkopf – guitar
Bryan Kienlen – bass
Michael McDermott – drums
Tim Gilles – engineer
Arun Venkatesh – assistant engineer
Tracks 7-12:
Chris Head – guitar, vocals
Chris #2 – bass, vocals
Justin Sane – guitar, vocals
Pat Thetic – drums
Matt Harrington – engineer
Kevin Facer – assistant engineer
Tommy M. – drum technician
Mark Defiant – vocals on "Smash it to Pieces"
The Code – backing vocals on "Smash it to Pieces" and "Gifts from America: With Love, the U.S.A."

References

External links
BYO Split Series Volume IV on BYO Records

BYO Split Series
2002 albums
The Bouncing Souls albums
Anti-Flag albums